Basketball at the 2003 Games of the Small States of Europe was held from 3 to 7 June 2003. Games were played at the University Sports Complex of Gzira.

Medal summary

Men's tournament
Men's tournament was played by seven teams divided into two groups where the two first qualified teams would join the semifinals.

Preliminary round

Group A

Group B

Final round

Fifth position game

Women's tournament
Women's tournament was played by only four teams.

Table

References

External links
Results at the NOC Malta website

Basketball
2003
2002–03 in European basketball
International basketball competitions hosted by Malta